The Premio 40 Principales for Best Spanish Song is an honor presented annually at Los Premios 40 Principales.

References

Best Spanish Song
2006 establishments in Spain
Awards established in 2006